Nahanni Butte (Slavey language: Tthenáágó  "strong rock") is a "Designated Authority" in the Dehcho Region of the Northwest Territories, Canada. The community is located at the confluence of the Liard and South Nahanni Rivers in the southwestern part of the NWT.

Although it was not normally accessible by road, a winter road was constructed yearly until an all-season road was completed in October 2010 as far as the Liard River. Access from there is by river taxi in summer and ice road in winter; there are no plans for a vehicle ferry.

Demographics

In 2016, there were 80 First Nations people and 40 people speak a Slavey language.

First Nations
The Dene of the community are represented by the Nahɂą Dehé Dene Band and belong to the Dehcho First Nations.

See also 
 Nahanni Butte Airport
 Nahanni Butte Water Aerodrome

References

External links 

Communities in the Dehcho Region
Dene communities
Road-inaccessible communities of the Northwest Territories